Justin Duff (born 10 May 1988) is a Canadian volleyball player, a member of Canada men's national volleyball team and Polish club Espadon Szczecin, a bronze medalist of NORCECA Championship (2011, 2013).

In July 2016, he was named to Canada's 2016 Olympic team.

Career

Clubs
In 2014 he signed a contract with Transfer Bydgoszcz. After one season in Portuguese club Benfica Lisbon and one season in Greek Olympiacos Piraeus, he decided to come back to Poland and join Espadon Szczecin team.

Sporting achievements

Club

National championships
 2010/2011  Austrian Championship, with Aon hotVolleys Vienna
 2011/2012  Turkish Championship, with Arkas Izmir
 2012/2013  Turkish Championship, with Arkas Izmir
 2012/2013  Russian Championship, with Belogorie Belgorod
 2016/2017  Greek Cup, with Olympiacos Piraeus

National Team
 2011  Pan American Cup
 2011  NORCECA Championship
 2013  NORCECA Championship
 2015   NORCECA Championship

References

1988 births
Living people
Volleyball players from Winnipeg
Canadian men's volleyball players
Olympiacos S.C. players
Expatriate volleyball players in Poland
Canadian expatriate sportspeople in Poland
BKS Visła Bydgoszcz players
Canadian expatriate sportspeople in Portugal
Expatriate volleyball players in Greece
Canadian expatriate sportspeople in Greece
Volleyball players at the 2016 Summer Olympics
Olympic volleyball players of Canada
Galatasaray S.K. (men's volleyball) players